Sugiyasu Dam  is a dam in Miyazaki Prefecture, Japan, finished in 1963.

References 

Dams in Miyazaki Prefecture
Dams completed in 1963